Una Stubbs (1 May 1937 – 12 August 2021) was an English actress, television personality and dancer who appeared on British television and in the theatre, and occasionally in films. She became known after appearing in the film Summer Holiday (1963) and later played Rita Rawlins in the BBC sitcoms Till Death Us Do Part (1965–1975) and In Sickness and in Health (1985–1992). Her other television roles include Aunt Sally in Worzel Gummidge (1979–1981) and Miss Bat in The Worst Witch (1998–2001). She also appeared as Sherlock Holmes's landlady Mrs. Hudson in the BAFTA-winning television series Sherlock (2010–2017).

Career
As a 16-year-old, in 1953, she danced in a Folies Bergère-style musical revue, "Pardon My French", at the Prince of Wales Theatre, alongside Frankie Howerd and the pianist Winifred Atwell. She first appeared on television as one of the Dougie Squires Dancers on the British television music show Cool for Cats in 1956. She also appeared as a dancer at the London Palladium. and worked in cabaret, clubs and revues in London, and was one of Lionel Blair's dance ensemble.

During 1958–59, Stubbs was the "cover girl" of Dairy Box chocolates, produced by Rowntree's. She referred to herself as the "Rowntrees Chocolate Girl", when describing a visit she made to the Rowntree's factory in York (where, unknown to her, her grandfather had worked).

In 1963, she joined the cast of new charades-based gameshow Don't Say a Word (ITV), a forerunner of Give Us a Clue. Her first screen role was in the Cliff Richard film, Summer Holiday (1963). She also appeared in Richard's next film, Wonderful Life (1964). Soon afterwards, she made her breakthrough in television comedy, playing Rita, the married daughter of Alf Garnett in the BBC sitcom Till Death Us Do Part (1966–1975). In 1968, as a direct spin off from the sitcom, she appeared, alongside Warren Mitchell, in a series of television adverts for Findus frozen products.

She also appeared in the short-lived sitcom Till Death... (1981), again playing Rita. She played Rita a third time in a few episodes of the BBC sitcom In Sickness and in Health (1985–1992). During 1970–71, Stubbs teamed again with Cliff Richard to appear each week on his BBC1 TV Series, It's Cliff Richard!. When she did not take part in the next series as it was broadcast shortly after she had  a baby, her TV "mother", Dandy Nichols from Till Death Us Do Part, took her place.

Stubbs featured in the Fawlty Towers episode "The Anniversary" in 1979. From 1979 to 1981, she played Aunt Sally in the ITV children's series Worzel Gummidge opposite Jon Pertwee and Barbara Windsor, and was for several years a team captain in the weekly game show Give Us a Clue in the 1980s, reuniting her with Lionel Blair, the other team captain.

She appeared in the shows Midsomer Murders, Heartbeat, Casualty, Keeping Up Appearances, Born and Bred and The Worst Witch. In recent years, Stubbs also appeared in Victoria Wood's We'd Quite Like to Apologise, The Catherine Tate Show, Agatha Christie's Marple, EastEnders, Benidorm and, from 2010, Sherlock as Mrs. Hudson. She appeared in an episode of Call the Midwife in 2015.

Stubbs was on the West End stage in Noël Coward's Star Quality with Penelope Keith in 2001 and Friedrich Schiller's Don Carlos with Derek Jacobi in 2005. Her other theatre credits included La Cage Aux Folles at the Menier Chocolate Factory, Pygmalion at the Theatre Royal, Bath and Old Vic and The Family Reunion at the Donmar Warehouse. She was in the original cast of The Curious Incident of the Dog in the Night-Time at the National Theatre in 2012.

In 2015 she co-presented The Big Painting Challenge on BBC One alongside Richard Bacon.

Personal life
Stubbs was born in 1937 in Welwyn Garden City, Hertfordshire, the daughter of Angela K. Rawlinson and Clarence Reginald Stubbs. She grew up in Hinckley, Leicestershire, and was sent to La Roche dancing school in Slough by her mother. She was married to the actor Peter Gilmore from 1958 to 1969: they adopted a son, Jason. After their divorce in 1969, she married actor Nicky Henson. They divorced in 1975 but remained good friends. She and Henson had two children: composer Christian Henson (born 25 December 1971), and musician-composer Joe Henson (born 18 September 1973).

For many years, Stubbs sketched vignettes of characters around London, and held exhibitions of these near her Mayfair home. On several occasions, paintings by Stubbs were exhibited at the Royal Academy's Summer Exhibition, most recently in 2020.

Stubbs had known her Sherlock co-star Benedict Cumberbatch since he was four years old, as she had worked with his mother, Wanda Ventham. Stubbs was the subject of an episode of the BBC series Who Do You Think You Are?, broadcast on 24 July 2013. It discussed several of her ancestors, including her great-grandfather Sir Ebenezer Howard, who was the founder of the garden city movement, and was the driving force in the design and creation of the first garden cities, Letchworth Garden City and Welwyn Garden City, situated in Hertfordshire.

After several months of ill health, Stubbs died at her home in Edinburgh on 12 August 2021, at the age of 84.

Filmography

Film

Television

Audio dramas

Theatre

References

External links

 

1937 births
2021 deaths
People from Welwyn Garden City
English film actresses
English stage actresses
English television actresses
Actresses from Hertfordshire
20th-century English actresses
21st-century English actresses
English dancers
Audiobook narrators